Thomas William Turnure (born July 9, 1957) is a former professional American football offensive lineman in the National Football League (NFL). In college, Turnure played for the University of Washington and was named to the 1979 All-Pacific-10 Conference football team.  Professionally, Turnure played for the Detroit Lions (1980–1983, 1985–1986) for six seasons.

References

1957 births
Living people
Players of American football from Seattle
American football offensive linemen
Washington Huskies football players
Detroit Lions players